Puente Alsina is an Argentine railway station in the Greater Buenos Aires neighbourhood of Valentín Alsina in the Lanús partido of Buenos Aires Province. The station takes its name from the nearby bridge of Puente Alsina over the Riachuelo River.  On the other side of this bridge lies the neighbourhood of Nueva Pompeya within the city of Buenos Aires.

History 

Built by the British-owned Buenos Aires Midland Railway, the station was opened in 1908 as the terminus for their metre gauge line to Carhué, in the southwest of the province. The original plan was to boost the importance of the line by extending it from Puente Alsina into the centre of the nearby city. However, the fact that the company held a concession from the province, meant that it was unable to enter the Federal Capital. When the entire Argentine railway network was nationalized in 1948, during Juan Peron's presidency, the BAMR became part of the state-owned company Ferrocarril Belgrano.

As part of the privatization of the whole Argentine railway network in the early 1990s, private company Metropolitano was granted a concession to operate the service, part of the Linea Belgrano Sur, as far as General Belgrano, from 1 May 1994. In spite of the large state subsidies received by the company, a serious decline in the standard of its services led to the concession being revoked on 22 May 2007, after which the line was run by UGOFE, a consortium formed by private companies Ferrovías, Metrovías and Trenes de Buenos Aires.

Since March 2015 the station has been operated by state-owned Trenes Argentinos, after the Government rescinded the contract with private company Argentren signed one year before.

Bibliography
 British Railways in Argentina 1857-1914: A Case Study of Foreign Investment by Colin M. Lewis, Athlone Press (University of London), 1983
 British Railways in Argentina 1860-1948 by H.R. Stones - P.E. Waters & Associates, Bromley, Kent, England, 1993

References

Railway stations in Buenos Aires
Railway stations opened in 1908
1908 establishments in Argentina